National Route 127 is a national highway of Japan connecting Tateyama, Chiba and Kisarazu, Chiba in Japan, with a total length of 54.5 km (33.86 mi).

History
When designated in 1953, Route 127 originally ran from Tateyama to Chiba. The section from Kisarazu to Chiba was redesignated as a portion of Route 16 on 1 April 1963, shortening Route 127 to its current route.

In popular culture
Japanese Bōsōzoku rock group Kishidan referenced this route in their debut album, an independently released mini-album titled Bousou Yotarou Rock 'n' Roll where the final song was  called Kokudou 127 Gousen no Shiroki Inazuma (國道127號線の白き稻妻). This song was re-released on Kishidan's first full album, 1/6 Lonely Night. In 2008, while on hiatus while Kishidan members were performing in DJ Ozma, both Kishidan and DJ Ozma switched record labels from EMI Music Japan to Avex Trax. Before switching, Kishidan released a double compilation album of songs from their EMI years, titled, Kishidan Grateful EMI Years 2001-2008 Bousou Tamashii ~Song for Route 127~. Several of the group's members are from Chiba Prefecture, where the route is located.

References

127
Roads in Chiba Prefecture